Turbo lorenzi is a species of sea snail, a marine gastropod mollusk, in the family Turbinidae, the turban snails.

Description
The length of the shell attains 33.1 mm.

Distribution
This species in the Indian ocean off Mauritius.

References

 Alf & Kreipl, 2015) Alf A. & Kreipl K. (2015). A new species of the family Turbinidae Rafinesque, 1815 from Saint Brandon, Western Indian Ocean (Mollusca, Gastropoda, Vetigastropoda, Turbinidae). Spixiana. 38(1): 3-10

Turbinidae
Gastropods described in 2015